Woodlands Vale is a Victorian era house in Seaview on the Isle of Wight. It is a Grade II* listed building.

History
The Woodlands Vale estate was first developed by Charles Coach in the 1820s. In 1869 the property was bought by Augustus Gough-Calthorpe (1829-1910). Gough-Calthorpe, third son of Frederick Gough, 4th Baron Calthorpe, succeeded to the title on the death of his elder brother, Frederick Gough-Calthorpe, 5th Baron Calthorpe, in 1893. His father had previously engaged Samuel Sanders Teulon to build the Calthorpe's main country house, Elvetham Hall in Hampshire and Gough-Calthorpe engaged Teulon to redesign the existing house at Woodlands Vale as a seaside retreat. Building went on for the next forty years, firstly under Teulon and subsequently under the direction of Stephen Salter, and outlasted the sixth Lord Caltorpe, being continued by his younger brother, Somerset Gough-Calthorpe, 7th Baron Calthorpe, following his succession in 1910.

During the 20th century the house operated as a hotel, but was later re-converted to a private residence and is for sale, as of January 2023.

Architecture and description
The original house at Woodland Vale was a large stone building of two storeys. Teulon's, and subsequently Salter's, efforts transformed it into a Renaissance Revival house, "distantly derived from French château precedent." Teulon was among the more extreme of the major architects of the Gothic Revival. The critic Henry-Russell Hitchcock considered Elvetham Hall "so complex in its composition and so varied in its detailing that it quite defies description". At Woodlands, Teulon and Salter encased the existing house in additions, including entrance and staircase towers by Teulon, an "amazingly incongruous" porte-cochere, by Salter, and gables and a tower to the garden front, again by Teulon. These were supplemented by a loggia, a veranda and a billiard room. In its survey of 1912, shortly after the house was largely complete, the Victoria County History described Woodlands Vale as one of the "principal residences" of the parish. Its interior contains much original work.

The gardens have a number of features typical of the Victorian era in which it was created, including a pet cemetery and a Japanese garden. The garden is designated at Grade II on the Register of Historic Parks and Gardens. The house, along with a number of ancillary features, is listed at Grade II*, while the lodge, two structures within the grounds and some steps and a Shinto arch within the Japanese Garden are all listed at Grade II.

Footnotes

References

Sources
 
 
 
 
 

Country houses on the Isle of Wight
Grade II* listed buildings on the Isle of Wight
Gardens on the Isle of Wight
Grade II* listed houses
Houses on the Isle of Wight